Jazz Is Universal is an album by the Kenny Clarke/Francy Boland Big Band featuring performances recorded in Germany in 1961 for the Atlantic label. The album was the first by the Big Band although earlier recordings by Kenny Clarke and Francy Boland's Octet had been released previously.

Reception

AllMusic awarded the album 3 stars.

Track listing
All compositions by Francy Boland except where noted.
 "Box 703, Washington, D.C." - 5:06
 "The Styx" - 3:54
 "Gloria" (Bronisław Kaper) - 4:39
 "Los Bravos" - 5:03
 "Charon's Ferry" - 6:10
 "Volutes" - 6:01
 "Last Train from Overbrook" (James Moody) - 6:41

Personnel 
Kenny Clarke - drums
Francy Boland - piano, arranger
Benny Bailey, Jimmy Deuchar, Maffy Falay, Roger Guérin - trumpet
Nat Peck, Åke Persson - trombone
Derek Humble - alto saxophone
Karl Drewo, Zoot Sims - tenor saxophone
Sahib Shihab - baritone saxophone, flute
Jimmy Woode - bass

References 

1962 albums
Kenny Clarke/Francy Boland Big Band albums
Atlantic Records albums